Phrynium imbricatum is a species of plant in the family Marantaceae.  It can be found from India through to most of Indo-China; no subspecies are listed in the Catalogue of Life.

References

External links

Marantaceae
Flora of Asia
imbricatum
Plants described in 1820
Taxa named by William Roxburgh